Rod L. Evans is an American philosopher, author, and lecturer who writes and speaks on ethics, religion, political philosophy, and English usage.

Evans graduated from Old Dominion University and received a Ph.D. in philosophy from the University of Virginia. He is currently Lecturer of Philosophy at Old Dominion University.

He has published seventeen books, including books about political philosophy, religion, lexicography, English usage, and recreational linguistics.

Publications
 Alcohol and Drugs
 Fundamentalism: Hazards and Heartbreaks
 Drug Legalization: For and Against
 The Right Words
 The Quotable Conservative
 The Gilded Tongue
 The Artful Nuance: A Refined Guide to Imperfectly Understood Words in the English Language
 Thingamajigs and Whatchamacallits
 Tyrannosaurus Lex: The Marvelous Book of...Wordplay

See also
 American philosophy
 List of American philosophers

References

20th-century American philosophers
21st-century American philosophers
Political philosophers
Old Dominion University alumni
University of Virginia alumni
Old Dominion University faculty
Living people
Year of birth missing (living people)